Jiří Prskavec (born 2 May 1972 in Jablonec nad Nisou) is a Czech slalom canoeist who competed at the international level from the 1988 to 2002.

He won two bronze medals at the ICF Canoe Slalom World Championships (K1: 1995, K1 team: 1999). He also won a silver medal in the K1 team event at the 1998 European Championships in Roudnice nad Labem.

Prskavec also competed in two Summer Olympics, earning his best finish of 13th in the K1 event in Sydney in 2000.

His son Jiří is also a slalom canoeist and a medalist from Olympic, World and European championships.

References 

1972 births
Canoeists at the 1996 Summer Olympics
Canoeists at the 2000 Summer Olympics
Czech male canoeists
Living people
Olympic canoeists of the Czech Republic
Medalists at the ICF Canoe Slalom World Championships
Sportspeople from Jablonec nad Nisou